USS New Jersey may refer to one of the following ships of the United States Navy named after the U.S. state of New Jersey:

 , a battleship commissioned in 1906, decommissioned in 1920, and sunk in 1923 in bombing tests
 , a battleship commissioned in 1943, seeing service in World War II, Korean War, and Vietnam War; currently a museum ship in Camden, New Jersey.
 , a Block IV Virginia-class submarine ordered from General Dynamics.

United States Navy ship names